The Trophée des Grimpeurs, called Polymultipliée until 1970, was a single-day road bicycle race held annually in August in the region of Val-d'Oise, France, between Argenteuil and Sannois. Between 1980 and 2002 it was a criterium. Since 2005, the race was organized as a 1.1 event on the UCI Europe Tour, also being part of the Coupe de France de cyclisme sur route. In 2009 the race was last held, due to financial difficulties.

Since 2000, there has been a women's event. In 2009 it was won by Jeannie Longo.

Winners, Men's

Winners, Women's

References

External links
 Official site 

UCI Europe Tour races
Recurring sporting events established in 1913
1913 establishments in France
Cycle races in France
Recurring sporting events disestablished in 2009
Defunct cycling races in France
2009 disestablishments in France